Meidingu Naokhamba was a ruler of Ancient Manipur (Antique Kangleipak). During his reign, Manipuri traders reached out on horseback to upper Burma and China. Besides the Cheitharol Kumbaba and the Ningthourol Lambuba, he is also mentioned in the Chengleiron.
Naokhamba abducted the wife of King Thangyi Khongjromba of the Chenglei tribe when she was heavily pregnant. Later, she had a son named "Naophang Ahanba". During his reign, Chingjen Naran Panggalba, the king of the Chengleis left Kangleipak for westward lands.

References

Other books 

 
 
 
Kings of Ancient Manipur
Pages with unreviewed translations